Wong Shu Qi (born 26 November 1983) is a Malaysian politician from the Democratic Action Party (DAP), a component party of the Pakatan Harapan (PH) opposition coalition. She has served as Member of Parliament (MP) for Kluang since May 2018 and served as Member of the Johor State Legislative Assembly (MLA) for the Senai from May 2013 to May 2018. She has also served as the Assistant Political Education Director of DAP since March 2022.

Political career
She was elected in 2013 general election for the Senai state seat. In the 2018 general election, Wong was elected to the Parliament of Malaysia for the Kluang constituency, winning 47,671 of the 80,531 votes cast.

Election results

References

Living people
1983 births
Malaysian politicians of Chinese descent
Malaysian journalists
Malaysian women journalists
National Chengchi University alumni
Democratic Action Party (Malaysia) politicians
Members of the Dewan Rakyat
Women members of the Dewan Rakyat
Members of the Johor State Legislative Assembly
21st-century Malaysian politicians
21st-century Malaysian women politicians